KAUS-FM (99.9 MHz, "US 99.9") is a radio station broadcasting a country music format. Licensed to Austin, Minnesota, United States, the station serves the areas of Austin-Albert Lea, Mason City, Iowa, and Rochester, Minnesota. The station is currently owned by Alpha Media, through licensee Digity 3E License, LLC.

References

External links
KAUS official website

Radio stations in Minnesota
Country radio stations in the United States
Radio stations established in 1987
1987 establishments in Minnesota
Alpha Media radio stations